Rustica Cruz Carpio (August 9, 1930 – February 1, 2022) was a Filipino actress, scholar, playwright, philanthropist, and public servant. Most notably an actress, she performed on stage, film, and television. She received acclaim for her role as Lola Puring in Grandmother (Filipino: Lola), a film by Filipino director Brillante Mendoza which was selected to compete in various international film festivals, including Venice and Dubai. For her acting work in the said film, she was critically well-received, earning nominations and awards, winning the Gawad Urian for Best Actress, the Crystal Simorgh for Best International Actress at the Fajr International Film Festival in Iran, and the Las Palmas International Film Festival Best Actress award in Spain.

A scholar, she wrote more than 200 academic and journalistic articles, books, scripts, and stories published locally and abroad. She served also as dean of two schools of communication in Manila, and a graduate school.

Early life and education
Carpio was born on August 9, 1930, at Paombong, in the province of Bulacan, Philippines. She recounted that she started to sing in an operetta at age 10. She was educated at the Philippine College of Commerce in Manila, now Polytechnic University of the Philippines (PUP), where she finished an associate degree in commercial science with honors. She then pursued a Bachelor of Arts, major in English at Manuel L. Quezon University (MLQU), where she graduated magna cum laude. After winning Fulbright and International House scholarships, she chose New York University (NYU) in the United States for her graduate work, earning a Master of Arts in education, major in speech education in 1956 at NYU's Steinhardt School of Culture, Education, and Human Development. At the University of Santo Tomas (UST) in Manila, she obtained her PhD in literature, meritissimus, in 1979.

She was a UNESCO fellow in Dramatic Arts at the National School of Drama and Asian Theatre Institute in New Delhi, India.

Career
Carpio's first film role was in Ishmael Bernal's Nunal sa Tubig in 1975, and in the more recent roles in Captive, where she played a social worker. In Aparisyon, she was cast as a troubled nun, and in Ano ang Kulay ng Nakalimutang Pangarap, where she magnified the dilemma of an aging nanny. Aside from being an actress, she was also a Palanca Award-winning essayist, and a playwright and stage director in different plays under her name.

Outside the entertainment industry, she was also an educator. Dr. Carpio organized PUP's Department of Mass Communication in 1987, and became its first chairperson and first dean of the College of Communication. She was also the founder of the Master in Mass Communication program in 1990 of the PUP Graduate School. She was proponent for the building of PUP's Claro M. Recto Auditorium, and in 1998, she conceptualized the establishment of the Mass Communication Center in PUP. She also served as the inaugural dean of the College of Mass Communication at Pamantasan ng Lungsod ng Maynila (PLM).

Carpio served as consultant in arts and culture to PUP and was executive director of the President's Committee on Culture at Far Eastern University (FEU). She was a lecturer of mass communications, literature, and theatre arts at PUP, UST, PLM and FEU.

She served also as public servant and was appointed to various government posts in the Philippines, such as the Movie and Television Review and Classification Board (MTRCB), where she served as board member from 1996 to 1998, Videogram Regulatory Board (1998 to 2000), she was a member of the Movie Committee on Appeals.

Death
Carpio died in Imus, Cavite, on 1 February 2022, at the age of 91.

Awards

Awards and nominations
 Nominated – Movie Actress of the Year – 2014 PMPC Star Awards for Movies, for the film Ano Ang Kulay Ng Mga Nakalimutang Pangarap?
 Won – Lifetime Achievement Award – 2014 PMPC Star Awards for Movies
 Won – Best Performance by an Actress in a Leading Role (Drama) – 2014 ENPRESS Golden Screen Awards, for the film Ano ang kulay ng mga nakalimutang pangarap?
 Won – Crystal Simorgh for Best International Actress – 2011 Fajr International Film Festival, for the film Lola
 Won – Best Supporting Actress – 9th Gawad Tanglaw Awards, for the film Tarima
 Won – Best Actress – 2010 Gawad Urian Awards, for the film Lola
 Won – Best Actress – 2010 Las Palmas International Film Festival, for the film Lola
 Won – Ani ng Dangal Award from the National Commission for Culture and the Arts, for the film Lola
 Won – Lifetime Achievement Award – 2010 FAMAS Awards
 Won – 2008 TOFIL Awardee for Arts and Culture
 Won – Special Mention for Essay, Filipino Division – 1988 Palanca Awards, for the entry "Talinhaga, Hinaing at Pag-ibig ng Isang Makata”

References

External links

1930 births
2022 deaths
Actresses from Bulacan
Filipino women academics
Filipino women writers
Filipino film actresses
Manuel L. Quezon University alumni
Palanca Award recipients
Polytechnic University of the Philippines alumni
Academic staff of Polytechnic University of the Philippines
Steinhardt School of Culture, Education, and Human Development alumni
University of Santo Tomas alumni
Academic staff of the University of Santo Tomas